Aero Costa Rica was an airline based in San José, Costa Rica. In 1997 it ceased operations.

Its US offices were in Miami Springs, Florida.

Fleet and History 

Aero Costa Rica ACORI, S.A. started service on 11 May 1992 with two Boeing 727-200 Ex-Pan Am (N353PA and N354PA) from San José to Miami. This was the only international carrier that was able to break the airline monopoly in Costa Rica held by Lineas Aereas Costarricenses S.A. (LACSA) since 1945. In July 1992 Aero Costa Rica's flight ML-211 made an emergency landing at Owen Roberts International Airport, Grand Cayman when the flight engineer forgot to open an auxiliary fuel valve after taking off from Miami. Later that year the route San José-San Pedro Sula-Orlando was inaugurated but the company decided to drop it four months later.  In 1993 the livery and the fleet was changed from two Boeing 727-200 to two Boeing 737-200 (N170PL and N171PL) with this equipment routes from San José to Atlanta (ATL) and San Andrés Island (ADZ) in the Caribbean were added. A 737-200 was sub-leased to Halisa Airlines of Haiti and later to Honduran carrier Islena Airlines. The executives of the airline tried forging alliances with Cayman Airways, Aero Mexico and Iberia Airlines.

Due to serious financial difficulties and ill-fated administrations, both 737s were returned to the lessor at the end of 1994. In 1995 under the administration of Peruvian entrepreneur Zadi Desme the airline purchased a Boeing 727-100 (ex-American Airlines N-1974) named "Por Fin" (At Last). Desme brought back the original livery introduced in 1992. After the demise of the airline this airliner was parked in Miami International Airport for several years until it was scrapped.  The company wet-leased aircraft and crews from Falcon Air of Miami from October 1996 until July 1997. From July 1997 through September 1997 the company wet leased 727s (N12304 /N203AV) including crews from Nations Air Express based in Atlanta. Nation's Air flew routes between San Jose and Miami and Orlando during that time frame, after which it finally collapsed. Owner Calixto Chaves Zamora intended to sell the airline to a Pakistani company based in Miami and represented by a Cuban-American named Osiris Rosario. The check Chaves received had no funds and the company could not remain in business any longer.

References

External links

Aero Costa Rica

Defunct airlines of Costa Rica
Airlines established in 1992
Airlines disestablished in 1997